The Curtin Labor Alliance was a minor Australian political coalition that was formed between two minor right-wing groups, the Citizens Electoral Council (CEC) and the Western Australian Municipal Employees' Union, in 2001. The name sparked outrage from the Australian Labor Party both for confusing electors and invoking former Australian Labor Prime Minister John Curtin. The Alliance claimed that Curtin was a nationalist, and that they represented the views that he would have espoused if he was alive. The Alliance was accused by Labor politicians of racism and extremist views, which were denied by the leader of the CEC, Craig Isherwood. It fielded candidates at the 2001 federal election (including Adrian Bennett, who was the Labor member for Swan from 1969 to 1975), but achieved only mediocre results. The party was deregistered in 2005 after not contesting the 2004 election (which was contested individually by the CEC).

References
Hutchison, Geoff (2001). "The Curtin Labor Alliance sparks outrage", The World Today, Australian Broadcasting Corporation

2001 establishments in Australia
2005 disestablishments in Australia
Defunct political parties in Australia
Labour parties
Political parties established in 2001
Political parties disestablished in 2005